Bontadini may refer to:
Bontadino de Bontadini (died 1620), Italian hydraulic engineer, architect, mathematician and wood carver
Franco Bontadini (1893–1943), Italian footballer
Gustavo Bontadini (1903-1990), Italian leading Neothomistic philosopher

See also 
 Bontade, a surname

Italian-language surnames